Sofia Ivanovna Zhukova (1939 – 29 December 2020) was a Russian serial killer who committed three murders between 2005 and 2019. At the time of her last crime, she was 80 years old, making her the oldest serial killer in the history of Russia and the Soviet Union. Some sources claim that Zhukova partially ate her victims. She died of coronavirus before trial and was found guilty posthumously.

Biography
Zhukova was born in 1939 in the village of Zvyagino, Nizhny Novgorod Oblast. She had no education, could hardly read and write, and worked as a laborer. Later she moved to Khabarovsk, where she settled on the outskirts of the city - in the village of Berezovka, got married and gave birth to two sons. In 2005, Zhukova's husband died. After that, changes took place in her psyche, which was the reason for the murders. Zhukova often clashed with neighbors and threatened them, but no one took her threats seriously.

Crimes
On 14 December 2005, Zhukova hacked her eight-year-old neighbor Anastasia Alexeenko to death with an ax, dismembered her body and threw the dismembered remains into the street in a bag. She later explained the crime by the fact that the girl allegedly made too loud noises. Two weeks later, one of the residents discovered the dismembered remains of the girl. Nobody suspected Zhukova of committing the crime.

In late March - early April 2013, Zhukova killed her friend, 77-year-old Anastasia Mikheeva, who was visiting Zhukova in the apartment, with an ax.  Her dismembered remains were also found by local residents in the vicinity. Zhukova later explained the murder by the fact that the friend behaved arrogantly towards her.  In Zhukova's apartment, law enforcement officers found traces of blood, but she explained to them that her guest had a nosebleed due to high blood pressure. Zhukova was suspected, but not charged with murder.

On the night of January 28 to January 29, 2019, Zhukova hacked to death with an ax and dismembered the 57-year-old janitor Vasily Shlyakhtich, who rented her room.  His chopped up remains were found in the garbage by ten-year-old children.

Investigation and trial
Initially, Zhukova confessed only to the murder of the janitor, but later told her cellmates in the pre-trial detention center about the murder of a girl and a friend. The inmates told the investigators about this. Soon Zhukova herself pleaded guilty, telling in detail the circumstances and reasons for each murder, but after a couple of months she retracted her confession. A forensic psychological and psychiatric examination found Zhukova sane. At the end of December 2020, she fell ill with COVID-19 and was admitted to the city hospital No. 10 in the city of Khabarovsk, where she died on 29 December. She was found guilty of three murders posthumously.

See also
List of Russian serial killers
List of serial killers by number of victims

References

1939 births
2020 deaths
Deaths from the COVID-19 pandemic in Russia
People from Nizhny Novgorod Oblast
Prisoners who died from COVID-19
Russian cannibals
Russian female serial killers
Serial killers who died in prison custody